Mount Malinao is a potentially active stratovolcano located in the Bicol Region of the Philippines. The volcano displays strong fumarolic activity which is harnessed for generating electricity. Located on its slope is Tiwi Geothermal Power Plant, one of the first geothermal energy plant commissioned in the country.

Location

Physical features
On the summit of the volcano is a large crater with bare inner walls that are breached on the eastern side. On the lower flank this side of the predominantly andesitic volcano, is Luzon's largest solfataras and hot springs, some of which deposit siliceous sinter. Naglagbong and Jigabo are two thermal wells located on the volcano.

Tiwi Geothermal Power Plant
This area was one of the first studied for generating electricity starting with a 250 kW power plant in 1967. In 1979, the first of the three 110 MW geothermal power plant was commissioned that year; the other two, in 1980 and 1982. At its peak, the plant was producing a maximum of 330 MW output. Recently, the 1979 plant was decommissioned due to decrease in steam supply.

Classification
The Philippine Institute of Volcanology and Seismology (PHIVOLCS), the government bureau that deals with volcanism in the country classifies Malinao as a potentially active volcano.

Eruptions & activities
There are no historical eruptions from Malinao which is believed to have been active from about 500,000 years ago until 60,000 years ago.

1970 earthquake swarms
There was an increase in seismicity in 1970 accompanied by rumbling noises in Malinao prompting an issue of warning that the mountain might be reactivating. The tremors detected were ranging from 1 to 5 in intensity.

Small explosion in 1980
One person was injured and two buildings were damaged by the explosion. Prior to the event, as early as July 6, the area was experiencing unusual microseisms recorded at seismic station of the Commission on Volcanology (COMVOL) - the predecessor of PHIVOLCS - in the area. Geysering was also observed on the pool, two hours before the explosion. One theory about the cause of the explosion was water drawdown during the development of the Tiwi geothermal field.

Mythology

The volcano is believed to be the home of the ancient Bicolano god of beasts, Asuang, who challenged the supreme god of the Bicolano, Gugurang. He is worshiped alongside his friend, Bulan, the boy-god of the moon.

See also
 List of active volcanoes in the Philippines
 List of potentially active volcanoes in the Philippines
 List of inactive volcanoes in the Philippines
 Pacific ring of fire

References

External links
 Malinao, Philippine Institute of Volcanology and Seismology (PHIVOLCS) site.
 

Stratovolcanoes of the Philippines
Subduction volcanoes
Volcanoes of Luzon
Mountains of the Philippines
Landforms of Albay
Landforms of Camarines Sur
Potentially active volcanoes of the Philippines
Pleistocene stratovolcanoes